Erica patersonii may refer to:

Erica patersonia Andrews, a South African shrub; often misspelled as Erica patersonii
Erica patersonii L.Bolus, a synonym of Erica viscaria subsp. pustulata